Veronica DiCarlo Wicker (November 26, 1930 – December 10, 1994) was a United States district judge of the United States District Court for the Eastern District of Louisiana.

Education and career

Born in Monessen, Pennsylvania, Wicker received a Bachelor of Fine Arts degree from Syracuse University in 1952 and a Bachelor of Laws from Loyola University New Orleans College of Law in 1966. She was a law clerk to Judge Lansing Leroy Mitchell of the United States District Court for the Eastern District of Louisiana from 1966 to 1977.

Federal judicial service

Wicker was a United States Magistrate for the Eastern District of Louisiana, from 1977 to 1979. On June 5, 1979, Wicker was nominated by President Jimmy Carter to a new seat on the United States District Court for the Eastern District of Louisiana created by 92 Stat. 1629. She was confirmed by the United States Senate on September 25, 1979, and received her commission on September 26, 1979. Wicker served in that capacity until her death of cancer, on December 10, 1994, in New Orleans, Louisiana.

See also
List of first women lawyers and judges in Louisiana

References

Sources
 
 

1930 births
1994 deaths
Syracuse University alumni
Louisiana State University Law Center alumni
People from Monessen, Pennsylvania
Judges of the United States District Court for the Eastern District of Louisiana
United States district court judges appointed by Jimmy Carter
20th-century American judges
United States magistrate judges
Deaths from cancer in Louisiana
20th-century American women judges